Goyder is an electoral division of the Legislative Assembly in Australia's Northern Territory. It was first created in 1990, and is named after George Goyder, the South Australian surveyor responsible for carrying out the first freehold surveys in the area. Goyder encompasses large rural areas south of Darwin, covering 9,770 km², and taking in the towns of Bees Creek, Cox Peninsula, Virginia, Marlows Lagoon and parts of Berry Springs and Humpty Doo. When first created, it was even larger extending south to Pine Creek and east to Jabiru and the whole of Kakadu National Park. There were 5,583 people enrolled in the electorate as of August 2020.

Goyder was considered a staunch conservative electorate and a very safe seat for the Country Liberal Party for most of its history. It was created in 1990, and the endorsed CLP candidate, Terry McCarthy, defeated renegade former leader Ian Tuxworth to become the first member. McCarthy was handily reelected twice, serving two stints as Speaker. He retired in 2001, and Peter Maley easily retained the seat for the CLP.

However, in 2005, a string of factors caused a massive swing to the Labor Party—sparking memories of what had happened in the safe ALP seat of MacDonnell in 1997. In May, barely over a month before the election, the CLP expelled Maley over disagreements and a later dropped domestic violence order. While he decided not to run as an independent, he harshly criticised the CLP and urged his supporters to vote for Labor. In addition, prominent Litchfield Shire President Mary Walshe ran as an independent, and while she did not poll anywhere well as she had hoped, she directed her preferences to Labor candidate Ted Warren. The campaign of the CLP candidate, Keith Phasey, was further harmed when the media reported that his wife had been questioned by a Western Australian inquiry into the deaths of several cancer patients, leading to a police raid on the home eight days before the election, although the police had been careful to distance Phasey himself from the investigation. Finally, this came against the backdrop of a very large swing to the ALP across the Territory, which also resulted in Opposition Leader Denis Burke losing his very safe seat of Brennan.

In the end, the combination of factors saw the previously very safe CLP seat delivered to the ALP, with Warren narrowly defeating Phasey and becoming the first ALP member in the electorate's history. The final result was not known for several days after the election.  However, a redistribution ahead of the 2008 election made the seat notionally CLP, and the seat reverted to form when Warren was soundly defeated by Kezia Purick of the CLP. Purick consolidated the CLP hold on the seat in 2012, and was elected as Speaker. She left the CLP to become an independent in July 2015, and easily retained the seat as an independent in 2016.

Members for Goyder

Election results

Notes

References

External links
 Division profile from the Northern Territory Electoral Commission

Goyder